The boys' 100 metres competition at the 2010 Youth Olympic Games was held on 18–21 August 2010 in Bishan Stadium.

Schedule

Records
Prior to the competition, the following records were as follows.

No new records were set during the competition.

Results

Heats

Finals

Final E
wind: –0.3 m/s

Final D
wind: +0.2 m/s

Final C
wind: –0.3 m/s

Final B
wind: 0.0 m/s

Final A
wind: +0.1 m/s

External links
 iaaf.org - Men's 100m
 

Athletics at the 2010 Summer Youth Olympics
2010